Steve Sue is a social venturer most well known for innovation and entrepreneurship programs including Lemonade Alley, Project Lemon Tree and BizGym.com. Sue started his career as a home builder, founding Bedrock Development, Inc. in Oakland, California. Bedrock evolved into an award-winning environmental design firm with architecture, theme and branding units that created production housing, retail, restaurants, live entertainment sets and theme parks. He became known as conceptualist in a variety of industries culminating as a driving force to mega-resort developments around the globe in and through Las Vegas.

Sue's hand-drawing style became synonymous with the art of the big idea so AutoDesk, maker of AutoCAD, licensed his hand illustration style to create Impressions software to turn technical "DWG" drawings to Sue's hand-rendered style. Through AutoDesk, Sue learned software development. He then turned to creating software business, his first title being BizGym.com, an entrepreneur's growth system that combines business planning, financial forecasting and brand story development into one package.

Sue donated use of BizGym to schools including Iolani School in Honolulu, Hawaii, where he launched Lemonade Alley, an eco-entrepreneur culinary challenge. At Lemonade Alley, students grades K-12 invent unique recipes, build stands from recycled materials and sell lemonade for a day to raise money for a charity or school of their choice. Lemonade Alley is produced by Bizgenics Foundation, a 501(C)(3) nonprofit organization. Sue and his organizations have received multiple awards and recognitions. Bedrock Development, Inc. was named the sixth fastest-growing company in the San Francisco Bay Area by the SF Business Times, and Bizgenics Foundation, Lemonade Alley and Steve have won awards from several Hawaii-based associations including BBB Hawaii.

Career 

Sue's career began as a home building contractor under the tutelage of his father John Sue. As his business grew he showed excellence in design, brand story crafting and business development. He was well-known for drawing skills. Sue credits his skills to a mentorship under well-known casino designer Bill Bardsley. The ability to draw lead to working on a variety of building projects including theme parks, restaurant, retail, large corporate events, show set designs and other projects in the Los Angeles and San Francisco areas. He was hired by Autodesk to create a software program called Impressions which converts AutoCAD drawings into Sue's signature hand-drawing style. Sue went on to make software called BizGym.com. In 2012, he created a partnership between BizGym.com and the Hong Kong-based business CyberPort to create a Chinese language online entrepreneur toolset. Sue is currently a mentor at a number of Hawaii-based entrepreneurial associations including the accelerator Blue Startups.

In 2011, Sue launched a K-12 student challenge called Lemonade Alley. According to Sue, the challenge was created to improve children's life skills. Lemonade Alley got its start due to the BizGym website being used in schools such as ʻIolani School. This drew the interest of Capital One Bank, which gave a $60,000 grant to make Lemonade Alley a permanent event. He then created BizGym Foundation (later renamed Bizgenics Foundation) as a nonprofit foundation in order to receive grant money. The inaugural event hosted 30 student teams of 5 students to create lemonade stands for the day and sell for the charity of their choice. Charities included the Ronald McDonald House of Hawaii, St. Jude Children's Research Hospital, Make a Wish Hawaii and more. In 2014, the organization raised more than $15,000 for local Hawaiian charities.

Recognition and success 

In its sixth year of operation, Sue's home building business Bedrock Development, Inc. was named the sixth fastest-growing company in the San Francisco Bay Area by the San Francisco Business Times, part of American City Business Journals. At the 2014 BBB Hawaii Torch awards show in Honolulu, Sue was awarded the BBB Hawaii's Public Charity award for his work on the Lemonade Alley event as well as his work on BizGym Foundation. The Lemonade Alley event was praised by blogger Chelsea Seki, who found both the event and its cause to be admirable. A. Kam Napier (an editor for Pacific Business News) compared Lemonade Alley to the television shows "Shark Tank" and "The Apprentice" (both TV shows about people being judged for their business acumen by celebrities and business people), except with kids being the participants. Two brothers who participated in a Lemonade Alley event won an award for the lemonade that they made from the Hyatt Regency Waikiki Beach Resort and Spa. Their lemonade was then later sold at the resort, with a portion of the sales going to the Kapiolani Medical Center for Women and Children. Lemonade Alley was featured on the cover of the magazine "Midweek Oahu", which covered Steve Sue, BizGym Foundation, and Lemonade Alley. Parents and children who attended the event felt that it was a worthwhile event, and that the skills that the children learned from it were valuable. In an article detailing the highlights of West Oahu, Midweek staff listed Lemonade Alley and its lemonade. BizGym Foundation was one of three finalists (alongside Business Law Corps and the United Cerebral Palsy Association) at a Nonprofit Business Plan Competition held by the Hogan Entrepreneurs program and the American Savings Bank. BizGym Foundation and the other two finalists were awarded a total of $1,000 each.

External links 
 Steve Sue's official website
 BizGym and BizGym Foundation's official website
 Lemonade Alley's official website

References 

Year of birth missing (living people)
Living people
People from Hawaii
American people of Chinese descent
UC Berkeley School of Law alumni
UCLA School of the Arts and Architecture alumni